Oppa Thinking is a South Korean television entertainment program, distributed and syndicated by MBC every Monday at 23:10 (KST).

Content

Celebrities make promotional videos of themselves, produced by one of the teams, and upload them on social media to appeal to the public. The next episode, they announce the winner based on the number of new fans.

Cast members

Team 1

Team 2

Interns

Zhou Jieqiong – 4–9
Park Na-rae – Episode 7
Cao Lu – Episode 10–13

Former members

Cha Eun-woo – Pilot
Kyungri – Pilot
Yang Se-hyung – Pilot
Yang Se-chan – Pilot
Joy – Pilot
Lee Mal-nyeon – Pilot, Episode 1–3
Lee Sang-jun – Pilot, Episode 1–3
Kangnam – Episode 1–3
Yoo Se-yoon – Pilot, Episode 1–10
Solbi – Pilot, Episode 1–13
Lee Hong-gi (F.T. Island) – Episode 11–13

Guests

Ratings

2017
In the ratings below, the highest rating for the show will be in red, and the lowest rating for the show will be in blue each year.

References

External links
  

2017 South Korean television series endings
2017 South Korean television series debuts
Korean-language television shows
MBC TV original programming
South Korean variety television shows